The Vermont Miss Basketball honor recognizes the top girls high school basketball player in the state of Vermont. The award is presented annually by the Burlington Free Press, since 1991.

Award winners

Schools with multiple winners

References

Mr. and Miss Basketball awards
High school sports in Vermont
Awards established in 1991
1991 establishments in Vermont
Lists of people from Vermont
Basketball players from Vermont
Women's sports in Vermont
Miss Basketball